Asparaginase is an enzyme that is used as a medication and in food manufacturing. As a medication, L-asparaginase is used to treat acute lymphoblastic leukemia (ALL) and lymphoblastic lymphoma (LBL). It is given by injection into a vein, muscle, or under the skin. A pegylated version is also available. In food manufacturing it is used to decrease acrylamide.

Common side effects when used by injection include allergic reactions, pancreatitis, blood clotting problems, high blood sugar, kidney problems, and liver dysfunction. Use in pregnancy may harm the baby. As a food it is generally recognized as safe. Asparaginase works by breaking down the amino acid known as asparagine without which the cancer cells cannot make protein.

The most common nonhematological adverse reactions of asparaginase erwinia chrysanthemi (recombinant) include abnormal liver test, nausea, musculoskeletal pain, infection, fatigue, headache, febrile neutropenia, pyrexia, hemorrhage (bleeding), stomatitis, abdominal pain, decreased appetite, drug hypersensitivity, hyperglycemia, diarrhea, pancreatitis, and hypokalemia.

Asparaginase was approved for medical use in the United States in 1978. It is on the World Health Organization's List of Essential Medicines. It is often made from Escherichia coli (E. coli) or Erwinia chrysanthemi.

Uses
Asparaginases can be used for different industrial and pharmaceutical purposes.

Medical
E. coli strains are the main source of medical asparaginase. Branded formulations (with different chemical and pharmacological properties) available in 1998 include Asparaginase Medac, Ciderolase, and Oncaspar. (Crasnitin has been discontinued.) Spectrila is a recombinant E. coli asparaginase.

Asparaginase produced by Dickeya dadantii (formerly called Erwinia chrysanthemi) instead is known as crisantaspase (BAN), and is available in the United Kingdom under the brand name Erwinase.

One of the E. coli asparaginases marketed under the brand name Elspar for the treatment of acute lymphoblastic leukemia (ALL) is also used in some mast cell tumor protocols.

On July 24, 2006, the U.S. Food and Drug Administration (FDA) granted approval to pegaspargase for the first-line treatment of patients with ALL as a component of a multiagent chemotherapy regimen. Pegaspargase was previously approved in February 1994 for the treatment of patients with ALL who were hypersensitive to native forms of L-asparaginase.

On December 20, 2018, the FDA approved calaspargase pegol-mknl, an asparagine specific enzyme, as a component of a multi-agent chemotherapeutic regimen for ALL in pediatric and young adult patients age 1 month to 21 years. This new product provides for a longer interval between doses compared to other available pegaspargase products. Calaspargase pegol-mknl has received FDA orphan drug designation.

On 30 June 2021, the FDA approved asparaginase erwinia chrysanthemi (recombinant)-rywn) as a component of a multi-agent chemotherapeutic regimen for the treatment of ALL and lymphoblastic lymphoma (LBL) in people aged one month or older who have developed hypersensitivity to E. coli-derived asparaginase. The FDA granted the application for asparaginase erwinia chrysanthemi (recombinant)-rywn fast track and orphan drug designations.

Food manufacturing
The most common use of asparaginases is as a processing aid in the manufacture of food.  Asparaginases are used as a food processing aid to reduce the formation of acrylamide, a suspected carcinogen, in starchy food products such as snacks, biscuits and fried potato.

Side effects
The main side effect is an allergic or hypersensitivity reaction; anaphylaxis is a possibility. Additionally, it can also be associated with a coagulopathy as it decreases protein synthesis, including synthesis of coagulation factors (e.g. progressive isolated decrease of fibrinogen) and anticoagulant factor (generally antithrombin III; sometimes protein C & S as well), leading to bleeding or thrombotic events such as stroke. Bone marrow suppression is common but only mild to moderate, rarely reaches clinical significance and therapeutic consequences are rarely required.

Other common side effects include pancreatitis. These side effects mainly attributes to the dual activity of L.Asparaginase as it can also hydrolysis L.Glutamine to Glutamic acid and ammonia.

Mechanism of action

As a food processing aid
Acrylamide is often formed in the cooking of starchy foods. During heating the amino acid asparagine, naturally present in starchy foods, undergoes a process called the Maillard reaction, which is responsible for giving baked or fried foods their brown color, crust, and toasted flavor. Suspected carcinogens such as acrylamide and some heterocyclic amines are also generated in the Maillard reaction. By adding asparaginase before baking or frying the food, asparagine is converted into another common amino acid, aspartic acid, and ammonium. As a result, asparagine cannot take part in the Maillard reaction, and therefore the formation of acrylamide is significantly reduced. Complete acrylamide removal is probably not possible due to other, minor asparagine-independent formation pathways.

As a food processing aid, asparaginases can effectively reduce the level of acrylamide in a range of starchy foods without changing the taste and appearance of the end product.

As a drug
The rationale behind asparaginase is that it takes advantage of the fact that acute lymphoblastic leukemia cells and some other suspected tumor cells are unable to synthesize the non-essential amino acid asparagine, whereas normal cells are able to make their own asparagine; thus leukemic cells require high amount of asparagine. These leukemic cells depend on circulating asparagine. Asparaginase, however, catalyzes the conversion of L-asparagine to aspartic acid and ammonia. This deprives the leukemic cell of circulating asparagine, which leads to cell death.

Enzyme regulation
Type I L-asparaginase protein may use the morpheein model of allosteric regulation.

History
The discovery and development of asparaginase as an anti-cancer drug began in 1953, when scientists first observed that lymphomas in rat and mice regressed after treatment with guinea pig serum. Later it was found out that it is not the serum itself which provoke the tumour regression, but rather the enzyme asparaginase.

After researchers comparing different kinds of asparaginases, the one derived from Escherichia coli and Erwinia chrysanthemi turned out to have the best anti-cancer ability. E. coli has thereby become the main source of asparaginase due to the factor that it is also easy to produce in large amount.

The pharmacokinetics of asparaginase erwinia chrysanthemi (recombinant) (Rylaze) were evaluated in 225 recipients in study JZP458-201 (NCT04145531), an open-label multicenter trial in which asparaginase erwinia chrysanthemi (recombinant) was administered at various dosages and routes, and the results were used to develop a model to predict serum asparaginase activity at various timepoints.

Society and culture

Economics 
Normal asparaginase costs less than its pegylated version, pegaspargase.  However, because it doesn't stay as long in the body, the injections need to be more frequent, with the result that total cost of treatment may be lower for the pegylated version.

Names
Crisantaspase is the British Approved Name (BAN) for asparaginase obtained from Erwinia chrysanthemi. Colaspase is the BAN of asparaginase obtained from Escherichia coli. The United States Adopted Name of crisantaspase is asparaginase Erwinia chrysanthemi. Elspar, Kidrolase, Leunase and Spectrila are brand names for colaspase, while Erwinase and Erwinaze are brand names for crisantaspase. The pegylated version of colaspase is called pegaspargase. Oncaspar is the brand name of pegaspargase.

References

External links 
 
 
 
 

EC 3.5.1
Antineoplastic drugs
Orphan drugs
World Health Organization essential medicines
Wikipedia medicine articles ready to translate